Battle Bears Gold is a third-person shooter multiplayer video game developed by SkyVu, a company based in Omaha, Nebraska. It was first released on May 24, 2013 on the App Store and Google Play. The game was later released for Android on June 3, 2013 and Windows through the Windows Store later that year. It features 11 different 'classes' battling in 5 different game modes.

Gameplay 
Battle Bears Gold is a first-person shooter game, with cartoon styled bears starring in different roles in the game, as each of the 11 classes, battling each other out on various game maps. The 12 characters are Oliver (Soldier), B-1000 (Assault), Riggs (Heavy), Wil (Chub Scout), Huggable (Huggable), Astoria (Sniper), Graham (Engineer), Tillman (Demolition), Botch (Assassin), Saberi (Combat Tech), Sanchez (Arbiter), and Big Daddy Kane (Hustler). The players in the game compete in different game modes, with varying objectives based on which game mode is selected. The game has received multiple accolades from the "Best App Ever" awards, as well as commentaries, reviews, and coverage by sites like Slide To Play. The app was developed by SkyVu Entertainment, an Omaha-based company, and released as a successor to Battle Bears Royale. The game is SkyVu's current flagship game, and is supported by in-app purchases, in the form of joules, which also can be earned by playing the game, and gas cans, which have to be purchased. The game has a ranking system that progresses with every match.

Game Modes 
Team Deathmatch: Up to eight players are split into two teams and fight for four minutes. If both teams have the same number of kills, the team that dealt the most damage wins.
Free-For-All: An ally-less battle with a 4-minute time limit.
Plant The Bomb: Each team must co-operate and work together in order to carry a bomb from the center of the map to a disposal hatch located near or in the enemy base. 5-minute time limit. The team that planted the most bombs wins. In the event of a tie, the team with the most kills or damage wins.
Brick Battle: The players must do battle with bricks.
Tutorial: shows you how to play the game which includes how to: shoot, move, swap weapons, use specials, and other commands.

Ex Game Modes 
King of the Windmill: Two teams of four fight over bases known as "windmills" to earn points within four and a half minutes. The team that has captured the most windmills at the end of the time limit wins.

Supported Platforms 
The game is available for free on the Windows, Android, Google Play, and iOS App Stores. As of May 2014, all Battle Bears Gold platforms(except for Windows) are up to date on the most recent major balancing update, 2.23.

Battle Bears Gold supports in-app purchases through the Google Play Store, Windows 8 Store, and the Apple iTunes/App Store.

Maps 
The maps are in a wide variety of locales, including No Bears' Land (a warzone), Skate or Die (a skate park), and Abusement Park (a carnival). Each one has its own features that affect gameplay, ranging from overhangs that affect aerial weapons to semi-transparent walls that block the player-character's way; some maps are even interactive.

Reputation System 
After a match players will have a "thumbs up/down system" under them measured by a standard thumbs-up/thumbs-down system. Players may give ratings based on the actions of other players in-game. The reputation system is used to mark offending players and time them out, as well as reward positive action by players with free in-game currency.

Development 
Battle Bears Gold was released as a version of its predecessor, Battle Bears Royale.

Reception 
Gamewoof said of Battle Bears Gold, "Every now and again something that seems like a waste of time when starting out, surprises you and ends up being something worthwhile. Battle Bears Gold is one of these games."

Lonniedos said of Battle Bears Gold, "What does freakin'... that bear has a gun. I don't know if we're not giving this enough attention. im going to think that its probably the case because there's no too much attention for that, that bear has a gun, lets play."

Dan Avery of Queerty writes about Battle Bears, "Battle Bears, a hit release from SkyVu Entertainment, sees militaristic ursine soldiers blasting warm-and-fuzzy pink bears called Huggables. When the cuddly critters are shot, though, they bleed rainbows instead of blood and guts."

References

External links 
 Game website
 SkyVu website

2013 video games
Android (operating system) games
IOS games
Multiplayer video games
Third-person shooters
Video games about bears
Video games developed in the United States
Windows games